A Man in Love is a 1987 French-Italian-British drama film directed by Diane Kurys. Her first English language film, it was entered into the 1987 Cannes Film Festival.

Plot
Jane Steiner (Greta Scacchi) is an English-born actress considering giving up on her unfulfilling career as an actress to become a writer. She lives in France with her French mother Julia and English father Harry. By chance, during an excursion to Rome with her journalist father, she is offered a small part in an American film set in the 1950s about Cesare Pavese as Gabriella, Pavese's love interest. The lead role is played by Steve Elliot (Peter Coyote), a charming American who is passionate about the writer he is playing, although his work is unknown in the United States. He is married to Susan (Jamie Lee Curtis), who is at home in New York City but falls in love with his co-star Jane on the set. After meeting Steve, Jane abandons her relationship with her French lover and friend Bruno (Vincent Lindon).

After Jane's part in the movie is finished, she moves into Steve's rented villa on the outskirts of Rome while he continues to work on the film at the studio. The two of them soon become lovers and embark on a torrid affair, which is almost discovered when Susan shows up one day in Rome to see Steve on a surprise visit with their children; however, Steve's best friend Michael Pozner (Peter Riegert) manages to sneak Jane out of the house before she is discovered. Complications for Jane continue when Bruno tracks her down to Rome and eventually discovers the affair. In a jealous rage, he leaks the affair to the press just as Steve completes his work on the film. To makes things worse, Jane learns that her mother has terminal cancer and will die soon unless she returns to France quickly.

As the film comes to a close, Jane and Steve quietly end their romance since Steve has told Jane that he is unable to leave Susan or his family. Steve returns to America and Jane returns to France to be at her mother's side when she dies. After mourning the loss of her mother, Jane decides to embrace her future as a writer and in the final scene, she is writing her first book; it is a romance story loosely based on her relationship with Steve.

Cast
 Peter Coyote as Steve Elliott
 Greta Scacchi as Jane Steiner
 Jamie Lee Curtis as Susan Elliott
 Claudia Cardinale as Julia Steiner
 Peter Riegert as Michael Pozner
 John Berry as Harry Steiner
 Vincent Lindon as Bruno Schlosser
 Jean Pigozzi as Dante Pizani
 Elia Katz as Sam
 Constantin Alexandrov as De Vitta
 Jean-Claude de Goros as Sandro
 Michele Melega as Paolo
 Jole Silvani as Olga

References

External links

1987 films
1987 drama films
Adultery in films
Films scored by Georges Delerue
Films about actors
Films about filmmaking
Films directed by Diane Kurys
Films set in Rome
French drama films
Italian drama films
1980s French-language films
1980s Italian-language films
1987 multilingual films
French multilingual films
Italian multilingual films
1980s Italian films
1980s French films
French-language Italian films